Walter Case (1776October 7, 1859) was an American lawyer and politician from New York.

Life
Case was educated by private tutors, and then attended Newburgh Academy. He graduated from Union College in 1799. Then he studied law, was admitted to the bar in 1802, and commenced practice in Newburgh.

Case was elected as a Democratic-Republican to the 16th United States Congress, holding office from March 4, 1819, to March 3, 1821. Afterwards he resumed the practice of law. He was affiliated with the Whig Party after its formation.

He moved to New York City in 1844 and continued the practice of law until 1848, when he retired.

He was buried at the Fishkill Rural Cemetery.

References

1776 births
1859 deaths
Union College (New York) alumni
People from Pleasant Valley, New York
Politicians from Newburgh, New York
New York (state) Whigs
19th-century American politicians
Democratic-Republican Party members of the United States House of Representatives from New York (state)